(+)-Thujan-3-ol dehydrogenase (d-3-thujanol dehydrogenase, TDH) is an enzyme with systematic name (+)-thujan-3-ol:NAD(P)+ oxidoreductase. This enzyme catalyses the following chemical reaction

 (+)-thujan-3-ol + NAD(P)+  (+)-thujan-3-one + NAD(P)H + H+

This enzyme is isolated from the plant Tanacetum vulgare.

References

External links 
 

EC 1.1.1